In philosophy, philosophy of physics deals with conceptual and interpretational issues in modern physics, many of which overlap with research done by certain kinds of theoretical physicists. Philosophy of physics can be broadly divided into three areas:
 interpretations of quantum mechanics: mainly concerning issues with how to formulate an adequate response to the measurement problem and understand what the theory says about reality.
 the nature of space and time: Are space and time substances, or purely relational? Is simultaneity conventional or only relative? Is temporal asymmetry purely reducible to thermodynamic asymmetry?
 inter-theoretic relations: the relationship between various physical theories, such as thermodynamics and statistical mechanics. This overlaps with the issue of scientific reduction.

Philosophy of space and time

The existence and nature of space and time (or space-time) are central topics in the philosophy of physics.

Time

Time is often thought to be a fundamental quantity (that is, a quantity which cannot be defined in terms of other quantities), because time seems like a fundamentally basic concept, such that one cannot define it in terms of anything simpler. However, certain theories such as loop quantum gravity claim that spacetime is emergent. As Carlo Rovelli, one of the founders of loop quantum gravity has said: "No more fields on spacetime: just fields on fields". Time is defined via measurement—by its standard time interval. Currently, the standard time interval (called "conventional second", or simply "second") is defined as 9,192,631,770 oscillations of a hyperfine transition in the 133 caesium atom. (ISO 31-1). What time is and how it works follows from the above definition. Time then can be combined mathematically with the fundamental quantities of space and mass to define concepts such as velocity, momentum, energy, and fields.

Both Newton and Galileo,
as well as most people up until the 20th century, thought that time was the same for everyone everywhere.
The modern conception of time is based on Einstein's theory of relativity and Minkowski's spacetime, in which rates of time run differently in different inertial frames of reference, and space and time are merged into spacetime. Einstein's general relativity as well as the redshift of the light from receding distant galaxies indicate that the entire Universe and possibly space-time itself began about 13.8 billion years ago in the Big Bang. Einstein's theory of special relativity mostly (though not universally) made theories of time where there is something metaphysically special about the present seem much less plausible, as the reference-frame-dependence of time seems to not allow the idea of a privileged present moment.

Time travel

Some theories, most notably special and general relativity, suggest that suitable geometries of spacetime, or certain types of motion in space, may allow time travel into the past and future. Concepts that aid such understanding include the closed timelike curve.

Albert Einstein's special theory of relativity (and, by extension, the general theory) predicts time dilation that could be interpreted as time travel. The theory states that, relative to a stationary observer, time appears to pass more slowly for faster-moving bodies: for example, a moving clock will appear to run slow; as a clock approaches the speed of light its hands will appear to nearly stop moving. The effects of this sort of time dilation are discussed further in the popular "twin paradox".  Although these results are experimentally observable, an intrinsic aspect of Einstein' theory is an equation applicable to the operation of GPS satellites and other high-tech systems used in daily life.

A second, similar type of time travel is permitted by general relativity. In this type a distant observer sees time passing more slowly for a clock at the bottom of a deep gravity well, and a clock lowered into a deep gravity well and pulled back up will indicate that less time has passed compared to a stationary clock that stayed with the distant observer.

Many in the scientific community believe that backward time travel is highly unlikely, because it violates causality i.e. the logic of cause and effect. For example, what happens if you attempt to go back in time and kill yourself at an earlier stage in your life (or your grandfather, which leads to the grandfather paradox)? Stephen Hawking once suggested that the absence of tourists from the future constitutes a strong argument against the existence of time travel— a variant of the Fermi paradox, with time travelers instead of alien visitors.

Space

Space is one of the few fundamental quantities in physics, meaning that it cannot be defined via other quantities because there is nothing more fundamental known at present. Thus, similar to the definition of other fundamental quantities (like time and mass), space is defined via measurement. Currently, the standard space interval, called a standard metre or simply metre, is defined as the distance traveled by light in a vacuum during a time interval of 1/299792458 of a second (exact).

In classical physics, space is a three-dimensional Euclidean space where any position can be described using three coordinates and parameterised by time.  Special and general relativity use four-dimensional spacetime rather than three-dimensional space; and currently there are many speculative theories which use more than four spatial dimensions.

Philosophy of quantum mechanics

Quantum mechanics is a large focus of contemporary philosophy of physics, specifically concerning the correct interpretation of quantum mechanics. Very broadly, much of the philosophical work that is done in quantum theory is trying to make sense of superposition states: the property that particles seem to not just be in one determinate position at one time, but are somewhere 'here', and also 'there' at the same time. Such a radical view turns many common sense metaphysical ideas on their head. Much of contemporary philosophy of quantum mechanics aims to make sense of what the very empirically successful formalism of quantum mechanics tells us about the physical world.

The Everett interpretation

The Everett, or many-worlds interpretation of quantum mechanics claims that the wave-function of a quantum system is telling us claims about the reality of that physical system. It denies wavefunction collapse, and claims that superposition states should be interpreted literally as describing the reality of many-worlds where objects are located, and not simply indicating the indeterminacy of those variables. This is sometimes argued as a corollary of scientific realism, which states that scientific theories aim to give us literally true descriptions of the world.

One issue for the Everett interpretation is the role that probability plays on this account. The Everettian account is completely deterministic, whereas probability seems to play an ineliminable role in quantum mechanics. Contemporary Everettians have argued that one can get an account of probability that follows the Born rule through certain decision-theoretic proofs.

Physicist Roland Omnés noted that it is impossible to experimentally differentiate between Everett's view, which says that as the wave-function decoheres into distinct worlds, each of which exists equally, and the more traditional view that says that a decoherent wave-function leaves only one unique real result. Hence, the dispute between the two views represents a great "chasm". "Every characteristic of reality has reappeared in its reconstruction by our theoretical model; every feature except one: the uniqueness of facts."

Uncertainty principle

The uncertainty principle is a mathematical relation asserting an upper limit to the accuracy of the simultaneous measurement of any pair of conjugate variables, e.g. position and momentum. In the formalism of operator notation, this limit is the evaluation of the commutator of the variables' corresponding operators.

The uncertainty principle arose as an answer to the question: How does one measure the location of an electron around a nucleus if an electron is a wave?  When quantum mechanics was developed, it was seen to be a relation between the classical and quantum descriptions of a system using wave mechanics.

In March 1927, working in Niels Bohr's institute, Werner Heisenberg formulated the principle of uncertainty thereby laying the foundation of what became known as the Copenhagen interpretation of quantum mechanics. Heisenberg had been studying the papers of Paul Dirac and Pascual Jordan.  He discovered a problem with measurement of basic variables in the equations. His analysis showed that uncertainties, or imprecisions, always turned up if one tried to measure the position and the momentum of a particle at the same time. Heisenberg concluded that these uncertainties or imprecisions in the measurements were not the fault of the experimenter, but fundamental in nature and are inherent mathematical properties of operators in quantum mechanics arising from definitions of these operators.<ref>Niels Bohr, Atomic Physics and Human Knowledge, p. 38</ref>

The term Copenhagen interpretation of quantum mechanics was often used interchangeably with and as a synonym for Heisenberg's uncertainty principle by detractors (such as Einstein and the physicist Alfred Landé) who believed in determinism and saw the common features of the Bohr–Heisenberg theories as a threat. Within the Copenhagen interpretation of quantum mechanics the uncertainty principle was taken to mean that on an elementary level, the physical universe does not exist in a deterministic form, but rather as a collection of probabilities, or possible outcomes. For example, the pattern (probability distribution) produced by millions of photons passing through a diffraction slit can be calculated using quantum mechanics, but the exact path of each photon cannot be predicted by any known method. The Copenhagen interpretation holds that it cannot be predicted by any method, not even with theoretically infinitely precise measurements.

History of the philosophy of physics
Aristotelian physics

Aristotelian physics viewed the universe as a sphere with a center. Matter, composed of the classical elements, earth, water, air, and fire, sought to go down towards the center of the universe, the center of the earth, or up, away from it. Things in the aether such as the moon, the sun, planets, or stars circled the center of the universe. Movement is defined as change in place, i.e. space.

Newtonian physics
The implicit axioms of Aristotelian physics with respect to movement of matter in space were superseded in Newtonian physics by Newton's First Law of Motion.
"Every body" includes the Moon, and an apple; and includes all types of matter, air as well as water, stones, or even a flame. Nothing has a natural or inherent motion. Absolute space being three-dimensional Euclidean space, infinite and without a center. Being "at rest" means being at the same place in absolute space over time. The topology and affine structure of space must permit movement in a straight line at a uniform velocity; thus both space and time must have definite, stable dimensions.

Leibniz
Gottfried Wilhelm Leibniz, 1646–1716, was a contemporary of Newton. He contributed a fair amount to the statics and dynamics emerging around him, often disagreeing with Descartes and Newton. He devised a new theory of motion (dynamics) based on kinetic energy and potential energy, which posited space as relative, whereas Newton was thoroughly convinced that space was absolute. An important example of Leibniz's mature physical thinking is his Specimen Dynamicum of 1695.

Until the discovery of subatomic particles and the quantum mechanics governing them, many of Leibniz's speculative ideas about aspects of nature not reducible to statics and dynamics made little sense.

He anticipated Albert Einstein by arguing, against Newton, that space, time and motion are relative, not absolute: "As for my own opinion, I have said more than once, that I hold space to be something merely relative, as time is, that I hold it to be an order of coexistences, as time is an order of successions."

Quotes from Einstein's work on the importance of the philosophy of physics

Albert Einstein was extremely interested in the philosophical conclusions of his work. He writes:

I fully agree with you about the significance and educational value of methodology as well as history and philosophy of science. So many people today—and even professional scientists—seem to me like somebody who has seen thousands of trees but has never seen a forest. A knowledge of the historic and philosophical background gives that kind of independence from prejudices of his generation from which most scientists are suffering. This independence created by philosophical insight is—in my opinion—the mark of distinction between a mere artisan or specialist and a real seeker after truth. Einstein. letter to Robert A. Thornton, 7 December 1944. EA 61–574.

Elsewhere:

How does it happen that a properly endowed natural scientist comes to concern himself with epistemology? Is there no more valuable work in his specialty? I hear many of my colleagues saying, and I sense it from many more, that they feel this way. I cannot share this sentiment. ... Concepts that have proven useful in ordering things easily achieve such an authority over us that we forget their earthly origins and accept them as unalterable givens. Thus they come to be stamped as 'necessities of thought,' 'a priori givens,' etc.

The path of scientific advance is often made impassable for a long time through such errors. For that reason, it is by no means an idle game if we become practiced in analyzing the long-commonplace concepts and exhibiting [revealing, exposing? -Ed.] those circumstances upon which their justification and usefulness depend, how they have grown up, individually, out of the givens of experience. By this means, their all-too-great authority will be broken. Einstein, 1916, "Memorial notice for Ernst Mach", Physikalische Zeitschrift 17: 101–02.

See also

 Anthropic principle
 Arrow of time
 Causality (physics)
 Causal closure
 Constructor theory
 Determinism
 Digital physics
 Mind-body dualism
 Field (physics)
 Functional decomposition
 Fundamental interaction
 Holism
 Instrumentalism
 Laws of thermodynamics
 Macroscopic
 Mesoscopic scale
 Modal realism
 Monism
 Pluralism
 Physical ontology
 Naturalism:
 Metaphysical
 Methodological
 Operationalism
 Phenomenology
 Phenomenology (particle physics)
 Philosophy of:
 Classical physics
 Space & time
 Thermodynamics & statistical mechanics
Motion
 Physical
 Bodies
 Law
 System
 Physicalism
 Physics
 Aristotle
 Physics envy
 Quantum theory:
 Bohr-Einstein debates
 Einstein's thought experiments
 EPR paradox
 Interpretations of
 Metaphysics
 Mysticism
 Reductionism
 Relativity:
 General
 Special
 Space
 Absolute theory
 Container space
 Free space
 Relational space
 Relational theory
 Spacetime
 Supervenience
 Symmetry in physics
 Theophysics
 Time in physics

References

 Further reading 
 David Albert, 1994. Quantum Mechanics and Experience. Harvard Univ. Press.
 John D. Barrow and Frank J. Tipler, 1986. The Cosmological Anthropic Principle. Oxford Univ. Press.
 Beisbart, C. and S. Hartmann, eds., 2011. "Probabilities in Physics". Oxford Univ. Press.
 John S. Bell, 2004 (1987), Speakable and Unspeakable in Quantum Mechanics. Cambridge Univ. Press.
 David Bohm, 1980. Wholeness and the Implicate Order. Routledge.
 Nick Bostrom, 2002. Anthropic Bias: Observation Selection Effects in Science and Philosophy. Routledge.
 Thomas Brody, 1993, Ed. by Luis de la Peña and Peter E. Hodgson The Philosophy Behind Physics Springer 
 Harvey Brown, 2005. Physical Relativity. Space-time structure from a dynamical perspective. Oxford Univ. Press.
 Butterfield, J., and John Earman, eds., 2007. Philosophy of Physics, Parts A and B. Elsevier.
 Craig Callender and Nick Huggett, 2001. Physics Meets Philosophy at the Planck Scale. Cambridge Univ. Press.
 David Deutsch, 1997. The Fabric of Reality. London: The Penguin Press.
 Bernard d'Espagnat, 1989. Reality and the Physicist. Cambridge Univ. Press. Trans. of Une incertaine réalité; le monde quantique, la connaissance et la durée.
 --------, 1995. Veiled Reality. Addison-Wesley.
 --------, 2006. On Physics and Philosophy. Princeton Univ. Press.
 Roland Omnes, 1994. The Interpretation of Quantum Mechanics. Princeton Univ. Press.
 --------, 1999. Quantum Philosophy. Princeton Univ. Press.
 Huw Price, 1996. Time's Arrow and Archimedes's Point. Oxford Univ. Press.
 Lawrence Sklar, 1992. Philosophy of Physics. Westview Press. , 
 Victor Stenger, 2000. Timeless Reality. Prometheus Books.
 Carl Friedrich von Weizsäcker, 1980. The Unity of Nature. Farrar Straus & Giroux.
 Werner Heisenberg, 1971. Physics and Beyond: Encounters and Conversations. Harper & Row (World Perspectives series), 1971.
 William Berkson, 1974. Fields of Force''. Routledge and Kegan Paul, London. 
 Encyclopædia Britannica, Philosophy of Physics, David Z. Albert

External links

 Stanford Encyclopedia of Philosophy:
 "Absolute and Relational Theories of Space and Motion"—Nick Huggett and Carl Hoefer
 "Being and Becoming in Modern Physics"—Steven Savitt
 "Boltzmann's Work in Statistical Physics"—Jos Uffink
 "Conventionality of Simultaneity"—Allen Janis
 "Early Philosophical Interpretations of General Relativity"—Thomas A. Ryckman
 "Everett's Relative-State Formulation of Quantum Mechanics"—Jeffrey A. Barrett 
 "Experiments in Physics"—Allan Franklin
 "Holism and Nonseparability in Physics"—Richard Healey
 "Intertheory Relations in Physics"—Robert Batterman
 "Naturalism"—David Papineau
 "Philosophy of Statistical Mechanics"—Lawrence Sklar
 "Physicalism"—Daniel Sojkal
 "Quantum Mechanics"—Jenann Ismael
 "Reichenbach's Common Cause Principle"—Frank Artzenius
 "Structural Realism"—James Ladyman
 "Structuralism in Physics"—Heinz-Juergen Schmidt
 "Supertasks"—JB Manchak and Bryan Roberts
 "Symmetry and Symmetry Breaking"—Katherine Brading and Elena Castellani
 "Thermodynamic Asymmetry in Time"—Craig Callender
 "Time"—by Ned Markosian
 "Time Machines" —John Earman, Chris Wüthrich, and JB Manchak
 "Uncertainty principle"—Jan Hilgevoord and Jos Uffink
 "The Unity of Science"—Jordi Cat

 
Physics
Applied and interdisciplinary physics